Krananda oliveomarginata is a moth in the family Geometridae first described by Charles Swinhoe in 1894. It is found in the north-eastern Himalayas, China, Taiwan, northern Vietnam, Thailand and on Peninsular Malaysia, Sumatra and Borneo.

References

Moths described in 1958
Moths of Borneo
Boarmiini